The Microsoft text-to-speech voices are speech synthesizers provided for use with applications that use the Microsoft Speech API (SAPI) or the Microsoft Speech Server Platform. There are client, server, and mobile versions of Microsoft text-to-speech voices. Client voices are shipped with Windows operating systems; server voices are available for download for use with server applications such as Speech Server, Lync etc. for both Windows client and server platforms, and mobile voices are often shipped with more recent versions.

Voices

Windows 2000 and Windows XP 

Microsoft Sam is the default text-to-speech male voice in Microsoft Windows 2000 and Windows XP.  It is used by Narrator, the screen reader program built into the operating system.

Microsoft Mike and Microsoft Mary are optional male and female voices respectively, available for download from the Microsoft website. Michael and Michelle are also optional male and female voices licensed by Microsoft from Lernout & Hauspie, and are available through Microsoft Office XP and Microsoft Office 2003 or Microsoft Reader.

There are both SAPI 4 and SAPI 5 versions of these text-to-speech voices. SAPI 4 voices are only available on Windows 2000 and later Windows NT-based operating systems, but are also available as a download on Windows 9x operating systems as well. While SAPI 5 versions of Microsoft Mike and Microsoft Mary are downloadable only as a Merge Module, the installable versions may be installed on end users' systems by speech applications such as Microsoft Reader. SAPI 4 redistributable versions were downloadable for Windows 9x, although they are no longer from the Microsoft website.

The SAPI 4 versions of Microsoft Sam, Microsoft Mike and Microsoft Mary can be used on Windows XP, Vista and later with a third-party program (like Speakonia and TTSReader) installed on the machine that supports these operating systems; however, the speech patterns differed from the SAPI 5 versions of these voices. In addition, LH Michael and LH Michelle can work on Windows 7 and later if Speakonia and the SAPI 4 version of the voices in British English is downloaded.

Windows Vista and Windows 7 
Beginning with Windows Vista and Windows 7, Microsoft Anna is the default English voice. It is a SAPI 5-only female voice and is designed to sound more natural than Microsoft Sam. Microsoft Streets & Trips 2006 and later install the Microsoft Anna voice on Windows XP systems for the voice-prompt direction feature. There are no male voices shipping with Windows Vista and Windows 7, and neither Microsoft Mike or Mary will work on Windows 7.

A female voice called Microsoft Lili that replaces the earlier male SAPI 5 voice "Microsoft Simplified Chinese" is available in Chinese versions of Windows Vista and Windows 7. It can also be obtained in non-Chinese versions of Windows 7 or Vista by installing the Chinese language pack.

In 2010, Microsoft released the newer Speech Platform compatible voices for Speech Recognition and Text-to-Speech for use with client and server applications. These voices are available in 26 languages and can be installed on Windows client and server operating systems. Speech Platform voices, unlike SAPI 5 voices, are female-only; no male voices were ever released.

Windows 8 and Windows 8.1 
In Windows 8, there are three new client (desktop) voices - Microsoft David (US male), Hazel (UK female) and Zira (US female) which are intended to sound more natural than Microsoft Anna. The server versions of these voices are available via the above-mentioned Speech Platform for operating systems earlier than Windows 8. Other voices are available for specific language versions of either Windows 8 or Windows 8.1.

Unlike Windows 7 or Vista, one cannot use any third-party program for Microsoft Anna because there is no Anna Voice API for download (especially since there was never a SAPI 4 version of Microsoft Anna).

Windows 10 

In Windows 10, Microsoft Hazel was removed from the US English Language Pack and the Microsoft voices for Mobile (Phone/tablet) are available (Microsoft Mark and Microsoft Zira). These are the same voices found on Windows Phone 8, Windows Phone 8.1 and Windows 10 Mobile. 

Also with these voices language packs are also available for a variety of voices similar to that of Windows 8 and 8.1. None of these voices match the Cortana text-to-speech voice which can be found on Windows Phone 8.1, Windows 10, and Windows 10 Mobile. 

In an attempt to unify its software with Windows 10, all of Microsoft's current platforms use the same text-to-speech voices except for Microsoft David and a few others.

Mobile 

Every mobile voice package has the combination of male/female, while most of the desktop voice packages have only female voices. All mobile voices have been made universal and any user who downloads the language pack of that choice will have one extra male and female voice per that package. 

A hidden text-to-speech voice in Windows 10 called Microsoft Eva Mobile is present within the system. Users can download a pre-packaged registry file from the windowsreport.com website. Microsoft Eva is believed to be the early voice for Cortana until Microsoft replaced her with the voice of Jen Taylor in most areas. 

These voices are updated with Windows to sound more natural than in the original version as seen in updated retail builds of Windows 10.

Windows 11 

In Windows 11, it introduced three new "natural voices" starting with version 22H2: Microsoft Aria, Jenny, and Guy. The voices from Windows 10 were retained and reclassified as "legacy voices", however David was still used as the default for the desktop client.

See also
Speech synthesis
Comparison of speech synthesizers

References

External links
Text to Speech Software
Vista Watch: New Chinese features in Windows Vista

Speech synthesis software
Microsoft software